Salvatore Albano (May 29, 1841 – October 13, 1893) was an Italian sculptor.

He was born in Oppido Mamertina in Calabria, to parents of limited means. He began in Calabria as a sculptor of wooden Presepi or Nativity scenes. Because of his talent, his townspeople gave him a stipend to study in Naples. There he trained under a cavalier Sorbille, also from Calabria. After a year, he trained in the local Accademia under its director  Tito Angelini. In 1865, his native province continued his stipend of 60 lire per year for three years. He won a number of contests in his Naples. In 1867, he submitted his Resurrection of Lazarus and a Cain to an exposition in Rome. He moved to Florence by 1869, and spent the remainder of his career there.

As a young man, he completed a Conte Ugolino bought by Marchese Agostino Sergio. Among his other works are:
Tears and Flowers  (1864)
Moses in Anger smashes the Tablets with the Commandments (1864, Capodimonte)
Christ nell'Orto (1865)
Masaniello (1866, Accademia)
Eve (1869, Florence)
Gioachino Rossini- bust (1869, Florence)
Ariadne abandoned (1870)
Il Genio di Michelangelo for Baron di Talleyrand.
Venere Mendicante
The Fallen Angels (1893)

References

1839 births
1893 deaths
People from the Province of Reggio Calabria
Kingdom of the Two Sicilies people
19th-century Italian sculptors
Italian male sculptors
Accademia di Belle Arti di Napoli alumni
19th-century Italian male artists